The Autrique House was the first town house built by Victor Horta in Art Nouveau style. This house, built in 1893, represents an essential step in the evolution of the Belgian architect. In many ways, it was an innovative dwelling, although it does not feature the novel spatial composition of the almost contemporary Hôtel Tassel. The house is located at 266, /, in the municipality of Schaerbeek in Brussels, Belgium.

The Autrique House was built for the engineer Eugène Autrique and his family. Due to budget restrictions, the family wanted a simple but comfortable home. For this reason, many custom made details, which Horta designed himself in most of the other town houses he built, were abolished. The house was kept in a relatively good condition during the 20th century. In the 1990s, it was bought by the municipality of Schaerbeek. It was thoroughly renovated and is now opened to the public.

History
Built by Victor Horta in 1893 for his friend Eugène Autrique, the Autrique House constitutes the missing link between traditional private architecture and the emerging Art Nouveau style. All typical Art Nouveau characteristics are already present in this early work of Horta: fine iron pillars and columns of the facade, sgraffito, stained glass, mosaics, and importance of natural light and decorative elements of floral inspiration. These characteristics were to be developed and magnified by Horta and his disciples.

Building
The Autrique House was the first town house built by Victor Horta. This dwelling was already innovative for its application of a novel Art Nouveau decorative scheme that did not include references to other historical styles. However, the floor plan and spatial composition of the Autrique House remained rather traditional. On the deep and narrow building plot, the rooms were organised according to a traditional scheme used in most Belgian town houses at that time. It consisted of a suite of rooms on the left side of the building plot, flanked by a rather narrow entrance hall with stairs and a corridor that led to a small garden at the back. From the three-room suite, only the first and the last had windows, and so the middle room, used mostly as a dining room, was rather gloomy.

Awards
The Autrique House received in 2005 the Medal of Europa Nostra for "the scrupulous restoration of an early masterpiece of Victor Horta, and for the creation of a scenography which pays tribute to the private architecture of Brussels and opens a door to an imaginary world."

See also
 Art Nouveau in Brussels
 History of Brussels
 Belgium in "the long nineteenth century"

References

Notes

External links

 Official website of the Maison Autrique

Houses in Belgium
Museums in Brussels
Historic house museums in Belgium
Schaerbeek
Victor Horta buildings
Art Nouveau architecture in Brussels
Art Nouveau houses
Houses completed in 1893